Molerov Spur (‘Molerov Rid’ \'mo-le-rov 'rid\) is the ridge extending 4.5 km in the south foothills of Herbert Plateau on Nordenskjöld Coast in Graham Land.  It descends southwards into Drygalski Glacier, with ice-covered upper part rising to 1600 m and rocky lower part rising to 1432 m.  The feature is named after the Bulgarian artist Dimitar Molerov (Dimitar Vishanov, 1780-1853).

Location
British mapping in 1978.

Maps
 British Antarctic Territory.  Scale 1:200000 topographic map.  DOS 610 Series, Sheet W 64 60.  Directorate of Overseas Surveys, Tolworth, UK, 1978.
 Antarctic Digital Database (ADD). Scale 1:250000 topographic map of Antarctica. Scientific Committee on Antarctic Research (SCAR). Since 1993, regularly upgraded and updated.

Notes

References
 Molerov Spur. SCAR Composite Antarctic Gazetteer.
 Bulgarian Antarctic Gazetteer. Antarctic Place-names Commission. (details in Bulgarian, basic data in English)

External links
 Molerov Spur. Adjusted Copernix satellite image

Ridges of Graham Land
Nordenskjöld Coast
Bulgaria and the Antarctic